"Desafinado" (a Portuguese word, usually rendered into English as "Out of Tune", or as "Off Key") is a 1959 bossa nova song and jazz standard composed by Antônio Carlos Jobim with lyrics (in Portuguese) by Newton Mendonça.

Background
"Desafinado" was originally a response to critics who claimed that bossa nova was a new genre for singers who can't sing. The English language lyrics were written by Jon Hendricks and "Jessie Cavanaugh" (a pseudonym used by The Richmond Organisation). Another English lyric, more closely based on the original Portuguese lyric (but not a translation) was written by Gene Lees, and appears on some recordings as well.

Chart performance
The version by Stan Getz and Charlie Byrd (from the album Jazz Samba) was a major hit in 1962, reaching number 15 and number 4 on Billboard′s pop and easy-listening charts, respectively; their definitive rendering also reached number 11 in the UK. Ella Fitzgerald's version made number 38.

Accolades
The song was voted by the Brazilian edition of Rolling Stone as the 14th greatest Brazilian song. The 1959 João Gilberto album Chega de Saudade contained the song and was inducted into the Latin Grammy Hall of Fame in 2001.

See also
List of bossa nova standards

References

External links
 Jazzstandards.com
 Song lyrics

1959 songs
Bossa nova songs
Brazilian songs
1950s jazz standards
Bossa nova jazz standards
Ella Fitzgerald songs
Frank Sinatra songs
George Michael songs
Kali Uchis songs
Portuguese-language songs
Songs with music by Antônio Carlos Jobim
Grammy Hall of Fame Award recipients
Songs with lyrics by Newton Mendonça
Latin Grammy Hall of Fame Award recipients
Songs about music